Kyle Christian Kinane (born December 23, 1976) is an American stand-up comedian, actor and voice actor from Addison, Illinois.

Career
Kinane's first television appearance was on The Nanny playing "Young Roger Clinton".

His debut album Death of the Party, recorded at the Upright Citizens Brigade Theatre in Los Angeles and released in 2010 on AST Records, was met with critical acclaim. Kinane was named in Varietys "Ten Comics to Watch in 2010".

Kinane has had a longstanding relationship with the cable channel Comedy Central, including serving as the voice for their on-air announcements since 2011. His first Comedy Central Presents half-hour special was on February 25, 2011. Other Comedy Central programs on which he has appeared include Drunk History (on which he retold the story of the Haymarket affair while drunk), the game show @midnight, which he won seven times, and the 2014 animated series TripTank.

Kinane's first stand-up comedy DVD special, Whiskey Icarus, was released in 2012.  His second stand-up DVD special, "I Liked His Old Stuff Better," was released in 2015.

Kinane has performed his stand-up on television programs Last Call with Carson Daly, Live at Gotham, Conan and The Tonight Show Starring Jimmy Fallon. He has opened for comedians Patton Oswalt and Daniel Tosh on tour.

He has appeared on many audio and video podcasts, including Comedy Bang! Bang!, Doug Loves Movies, Getting Doug with High, The Grandma's Virginity Podcast, The Nerdist Podcast, Comedy Film Nerds, Stop Podcasting Yourself, The Adam Carolla Show, You Made It Weird with Pete Holmes, All Growz Up with Melinda Hill WTF with Marc Maron, and The Art of Wrestling with Colt Cabana. He was also featured in the web-series, Outside Comedy, where he discussed his love of mountain biking.

Kinane also runs his own podcast along with fellow comedian and indoor cat, Dave "Street Justice" Stone, entitled "The Boogie Monster."

Discography

Filmography

Film

Television

References

External links

1976 births
Living people
American stand-up comedians
Place of birth missing (living people)
Columbia College Chicago alumni
People from Addison, Illinois
Comedians from Illinois
American male film actors
American male television actors
American male voice actors
21st-century American male actors
21st-century American comedians
Stand Up! Records artists